The Confederated Tribes of the Goshute Reservation is located in Juab County, Utah, Tooele County, Utah, and White Pine County, Nevada, United States.  It is one of two federally recognized tribes of Goshute people, the other being the Skull Valley Band of Goshute Indians of Utah.

Government
The tribe's headquarters is in Ibapah, Utah, which is an English adaption form a native Goshute term, either from Ai'ba-pa (one name of the last chief of the tribe who was also known under the common chieftain name ta'bi) or from Ai-bim-pa / Ai'bĭm-pa ("White Clay Water" referring to the nearby Deep Creek). Their own name is Ai'bĭm-pa / Aipimpaa Newe ("People of Deep Creek Valley").

Reservation
Approximately 200 tribal members live on the reservation, which is located in White Pine County in eastern Nevada and Juab, and Tooele Counties in western Utah. The reservation was established by Executive Order on May 20, 1912. Today, the reservation is  large.

Economic development
The local economy is focused on agriculture, and some tribal members ranch cattle and cultivate hay.

References

Goshute
Native American tribes in Nevada
Native American tribes in Utah
American Indian reservations in Nevada
American Indian reservations in Utah
Geography of Juab County, Utah
Geography of Tooele County, Utah
Geography of White Pine County, Nevada
Federally recognized tribes in the United States